Sanjay Patel may refer to the fictional characters:

 Sanjay Patel, voiced by Maulik Pancholy in the American television series Sanjay and Craig 
 Sanjay Patel, portrayed by Maulik Pancholy in the American television series Weeds